The 1956–57 Panhellenic Championship was the 21st season of the highest football league of Greece and one of the most interesting championships in the 50s and also one of the most discussed due to the punishment of Ethnikos Piraeus from the HFF. Olympiacos won their 13th championship (4 consecutive) after an interesting race with Panathinaikos which ended in a tie and therefore the title was decided by a play-off round in which Olympiacos won.

Compared to the previous season, the teams that participated in the final phase of the championship increased by 4 (10 out of 6) and resulted as follows:
Athenian Championship: The first 3 teams of the ranking.
Piraeus' Championship: The first 2 teams of the ranking.
Macedonian Championship: The first 2 teams of the ranking.
Regional Championships: The 2 winners (Northern and Southern group).
An additional position was secured after a play-off round between the third teams Piraeus' and Macedonian Championship.
The qualifying round matches took place from 16 September 1956 to 11 January 1957, while the final phase took place from 13 January to 18 July 1957. The point system was: Win: 3 points - Draw: 2 points - Loss: 1 point.

Qualification round

Athens Football Clubs Association

Piraeus Football Clubs Association

Macedonia Football Clubs Association

Piraeus/Macedonia 3rd teams play-offs

|}

Regional Championship

Southern Group

Northern Group

Final round

League table

Results

Championship play-offs

|+Summary

|}

Replay match

Olympiacos won 1–0 on aggregate.

Top scorers

References

External links
Rsssf, 1956-57 championship

Panhellenic Championship seasons
1956–57 in Greek football
Greek